Hikki may refer to:

 Slang for the Japanese word hikikomori, a person who lives a reclusive life from society in their room
 Hikaru Utada (born 1983), Japanese pop singer-songwriter

See also
 Hiki (disambiguation)
 Hikkim, India